Lafayette County School District may refer to:
Lafayette County School District (Arkansas)
Lafayette County School District (Mississippi)